Sir Arthur Cunningham Lothian, KCIE, CSI (1887 – 16 November 1962) was a member of the Indian Civil Service and of the Indian Political Service. He was Resident for Rajputana and Chief Commissioner of Ajmer-Merwara from 1937 to 1942 and Resident at Hyderabad from 1942 to 1946. 

Educated in Aberdeen, at Christ Church, Oxford, and the University of London, Lothian joined the Indian Civil Service in 1911 and served in Bengal until 1905, when he joined the Political Department of the Government of India.

References 

 "Sir Arthur Lothian", The Times, 17 November 1962, p. 10
 https://www.ukwhoswho.com/view/10.1093/ww/9780199540891.001.0001/ww-9780199540884-e-48128

External links 

 

1887 births
1962 deaths
Indian Civil Service (British India) officers
Indian Political Service officers
Knights Commander of the Order of the Indian Empire
Companions of the Order of the Star of India
Alumni of Christ Church, Oxford
People educated at Aberdeen Grammar School
Alumni of the University of Aberdeen
British people in colonial India